Brachonyx is a genus of beetles belonging to the family Curculionidae.

The genus was first described by Schönherr in 1825.

Synonyms:
 Sarapus Schönherr, 1826
 Brachyonyx Agassiz, 1846
 Onychobrachys Gistel, 1856

Species:
 Brachonyx pineti

References

Curculioninae
Curculionidae genera